Francis Marion "Frank" Taylor (May 9, 1869 - May 22, 1941) was an American Thoroughbred horse racing trainer who trained Nealon and Worth to National Championship honors, the latter winning the 1912 Kentucky Derby.  He also trained Charles Edward, a colt that in 1907 set three track records on dirt including a World record.  

Among Taylor's wins were two editions of the Suburban Handicap which at the time was the richest and most important race in the United States open to older horses.

Frank Taylor retired from racing in 1934 after suffering a stroke. He died on May 22, 1941, at his residence in Chicago.

Champions
 American Champion Older Dirt Male Horse  (1907) : Nealon
 American Champion Two-Year-Old Male Horse  (1911) : Worth

References

	
1869 births
1941 deaths
American horse trainers
Sportspeople from Missouri